Brendyn "Tyce" Carlson (born September 23, 1970, Indianapolis, Indiana), is a former driver in the Indy Racing League IndyCar Series.  He raced in the 1996–2002 seasons with 30 career starts, including 2 at the Indianapolis 500. His 2 career IndyCar top ten finishes both came at the Las Vegas Motor Speedway in the 1999 and 2000 races. He was forced to take several years off after repeated concussions but regained his health and from 2005 to 2007 sought a return to the Indy 500, however he failed to secure a ride. He drove in the 2006 Freedom 100 Indy Pro Series event. He now is a co-owner of a Firestone Indy Lights team (formerly the Indy Pro Series), Fan Force United.

IRL IndyCar Series

 1 The 1999 VisionAire 500K at Charlotte was cancelled after 79 laps due to spectator fatalities.

Indianapolis 500 results

External links

1970 births
Living people
IndyCar Series drivers
Indy Lights drivers
Indianapolis 500 drivers
Racing drivers from Indianapolis
USAC Silver Crown Series drivers

PDM Racing drivers
Team Pelfrey drivers
AFS Racing drivers